The 14th Annual GMA Dove Awards were held on 1983 recognizing accomplishments of musicians for the year 1982. The show was held in Nashville, Tennessee.

Award recipients
Song of the Year
"El Shaddai"; Michael Card, John Thompson; Whole Armor Publishing (ASCAP)
Songwriter of the Year
Michael Card
Male Vocalist of the Year
Larnelle Harris
Female Vocalist of the Year
Sandi Patty
Group of the Year
The Imperials
Artist of the Year
Amy Grant
Southern Gospel Album of the Year
Feeling at Home; Rex Nelon Singers; Ken Harding; Canaan Records
Inspirational Album of the Year
Lift Up the Lord;  Sandi Patti; Greg Nelson, Impact
Pop/Contemporary Album of the Year
Age to Age; Amy Grant; Brown Bannister; Myrrh Records
Inspirational Black Gospel Album of the Year 
Touch Me Lord; Larnelle Harris, Greg Nelson; Impact
Contemporary Gospel Album of the Year (formerly Contemporary Black Gospel)
I'll Never Stop Lovin' You; Leon Patillo; Skip Konte; Myrrh
Traditional Gospel Album of the Year (formerly Traditional Black Gospel)
Precious Lord; Al Green; Al Green; Myrrh
Instrumentalist
Dino Kartsonakis
Praise and Worship Album of the Year
Light Eternal; Billy Ray Hearn; Birdwing
Children's Music Album of the Year
Lullabies and Nursery Rhymes; Tony Salerno, Fletch Wiley; Birdwing
Musical Album
The Day He Wore My Crown; David T. Clydesdale; Impact
Recorded Music Packaging of the Year
Dennis Hill, Michael Borum; Age to Age; Amy Grant
Album by a Secular Artist
He Set My Life to Music; Barbara Mandrell; Tom Collins; MCA

External links
 https://doveawards.com/awards/past-winners/

GMA Dove Awards
1983 music awards
1983 in American music
1983 in Tennessee
GMA